North Cove is an unincorporated community in Pacific County, Washington. North Cove is mostly residential, with some vacation rentals and a general store being the only commercial properties. The community suffers from the extreme coastal erosion of Cape Shoalwater, which has been diminished drastically in size, with the ocean claiming dozens of structures over the last 100 years and remaining a substantial threat.

Establishment 
The United States established a military reservation on Cape Shoalwater in 1854 after negotiating with Chief Ma-Tote of the Shoalwater Bay Tribe for the land. In 1858, the Willapa Bay Light was built on the site, becoming one of the earliest light houses in the state.

Even with the lighthouse in operation, ships continued to have difficulty navigating the waters around Cape Shoalwater, and the government decided to build the Shoalwater Bay Lifesaving Station in 1878. Captain George Johnson was assigned to keep the station, and he left his land claim near current day Raymond, Washington to purchase  near Cape Shoalwater. The town of North Cove was platted on this property in February 1884 by his wife, Lucy Johnson.

The town was in a beneficial position, as it was a convenient rest stop for ships making the voyage between Portland, Oregon and Seattle, Washington. Mrs. Johnson began opening her home to travelers, and soon opened it officially as the Hotel Norwood. At the time, the town also had a general store, a post office, a Knights of the Maccabees events hall, and over a dozen homes. A cannery also opened in 1909, providing employment for many residents.

Coastal erosion
By 1920, the Coast Guard decided to begin moving equipment from the military reservation to Tokeland, Washington due to erosion at North Cove (The United States Life-Saving Service merged with the United States Revenue Cutter Service to form the United States Coast Guard in 1915). The Willapa Bay Light was lost to erosion in 1940. By 1950, the entire station was in jeopardy of falling into the ocean, and the facility was relocated to Tokeland, with buildings being salvaged when possible but otherwise left to the ocean.

By 2016, 60 residential properties and 537 land parcels totaling over  had eroded into the ocean.

The nearby communities of the Shoalwater Bay Indian Reservation and Tokeland have also been affected by the rapid erosion of the north shore of the bay.

The community continues struggling to slow the rapid coastal erosion through ongoing efforts to maintain shorelines, including portions of Washington State Route 105. However, efforts to stabilize the shoreline using dynamic revetment, which employs natural materials such as driftwood and cobble to dissipate wave energy, are showing promise.

Geography
North Cove lies at the end of  Cape Shoalwater, at the mouth of Willapa Bay. It is south of Grayland Beach State Park along State Route 105.

References

 
Coastal erosion in the United States
Unincorporated communities in Pacific County, Washington
Unincorporated communities in Washington (state)